Ludendorf is a village in the municipality Swisttal in the North Rhine-Westphalian Rhein-Sieg district. It is situated approximately 18 km southwest of Bonn. On January 1, 2007 the village had a population of 539.
The city hall of the municipality Swisttal is located between Ludendorf and the neighboring village Swisttal-Essig.

Notes

External links 
 Website of the municipality Swisttal (German) 

Towns in North Rhine-Westphalia